The Padre Noguera Municipality is one of the 23 municipalities (municipios) that makes up the Venezuelan state of 
Mérida and, according to a 2007 population estimate by the National Institute of Statistics of Venezuela, the municipality has a population of 3,028.  The town of Santa María de Caparo is the shire town of the Padre Noguera Municipality.

History
On March 25, 1963, the Padre Noguera Municipality was founded within the Liberty District, and after December 3, 1964, changed its name to Liberty District Archbishop Chacon, now Arzobispo Chacón Municipality. In 1975, studies began to build a dam, and in 1980 the construction work flooded the area, forcing the evacuation of 20 of the 23 villages that existed in the town, leaving only the villages Florida, Vegón and the larger Tucupido Santa Maria of Caparo. The impact of hydroelectric development Camburito-Caparo was such that the extension of the county shrank from 319 km2 to 206 km2 due to flooding to keep the waters of the reservoir. On March 19, 1986, the municipality changed its name to Autonomous Municipality Padre Noguera.

Geography
The territory is divided into three areas due to water of the Caparo Dam. Part of the town is protected by the Tapo-Caparo National Park

Demographics
The Padre Noguera Municipality, according to a 2007 population estimate by the National Institute of Statistics of Venezuela, has a population of 3,028 (up from 2,565 in 2000). This amounts to 0.36% of the state's population.

Government
The mayor of the Padre Noguera Municipality is Alidio Josè Pérez Bustamante, elected on October 31, 2004, with 28% of the vote.  
He replaced Albidio Torres shortly after the elections.  The municipality is divided into one parish (Capital Padre Noguera).

See also
Santa María de Caparo
Mérida
Municipalities of Venezuela

References

External links
padrenoguera-merida.gob.ve  

Municipalities of Mérida (state)